James George Tetley (6 July 1843 – 10 March 1924) was an Anglican priest. and author 

Tetley was born in Torquay, educated at Magdalen College, Oxford, and ordained in 1868. After curacies in Caldicot, Badminton and Henley-on-Thames he was Vicar of Highnam from 1876 to 1892. He was Proctor in Convocation for the Chapter of Bristol and a Canon Residentiary at its cathedral from then until 1910 when he became Archdeacon of Bristol, a post he held until 1921.

References

1843 births
People from Torquay
1924 deaths
Alumni of Magdalen College, Oxford
Archdeacons of Bristol
People from Highnam
Clergy from Devon